Basilia boardmani, the southeastern myotis bat fly, is a species of fly in the family Nycteribiidae.  The insect is parasitic, and lives by taking blood meals from its host, a species of bat.  It differs from all other Basilia species by the presence of a finger-like process on the metanotum of the female (behind thoracic membrane).

References

Nycteribiidae
Articles created by Qbugbot
Insects described in 1934
Wingless Diptera